Isabella was a station on the Chicago Transit Authority's Evanston Line, now known as the Purple Line. The station was located at 1215 Isabella Street in Wilmette, Illinois. Isabella opened on April 1, 1912, and closed on July 16, 1973, due to CTA service cuts. Isabella was situated north of Central and south of Linden.

Due to poor continuity editing, Bob Newhart disembarks from the 'L' at Isabella during the open montage of The Bob Newhart Show.

References

1912 establishments in Illinois
1973 disestablishments in Illinois
Buildings and structures in Wilmette, Illinois
Defunct Chicago "L" stations
Railway stations in the United States opened in 1912
Railway stations closed in 1973